Ariosoma obud is an eel in the family Congridae (conger/garden eels). It was described by Albert William Herre in 1923. It is a tropical, marine eel which is known from the Philippines, in the western central Pacific Ocean.

The species epithet "obud" refers to the Visayan language term for Leptocephalid eels.

References

obud
Taxa named by Albert William Herre
Fish described in 1923